Tony F. Vainuku is an American documentary film director and cinematographer. He is best known for directing the Netflix documentary Untold: The Girlfriend Who Didn't Exist and the PBS Independent Lens documentary In Football We Trust.

Life and career
Tony was born in Salt Lake City, Utah and his parents were both immigrants: his father was from Tonga, and his mother from Holland. He graduated from Westminster College in Utah. In 2015, he directed his debut feature documentary In Football We Trust, along with Erika Cohn, which premiered at the Sundance Film Festival. In 2022, he directed the Netflix documentary  Untold: The Girlfriend Who Didn't Exist. Recently he signed with the production company M88.

Filmography

Awards and nominations

References

External links
 

Living people
American documentary film directors
American cinematographers
Year of birth missing (living people)